Xiaowandong railway station is a railway station located in Xiaowan East Town, Nanjian Yi Autonomous County, Dali Bai Autonomous Prefecture, Yunnan. It opened on November 6, 2021.

References 

Railway stations in Yunnan
Railway stations in China opened in 2021